Louis of Évreux (also called "of Navarre"; 1341 – 1376) was the youngest son of Philip III of Navarre and Joan II of Navarre. He inherited the county of Beaumont-le-Roger from his father (1343) and became Duke of Durazzo in right of his second wife, Joanna, in 1366.

Louis's first marriage was to Maria de Lizarazu in 1358. He took part on behalf of his brother Charles II of Navarre in the war against the Dauphin Charles.

His second marriage to Joanna, Duchess of Durazzo, brought him the rights to Durazzo and the Kingdom of Albania, which he strove to recover. He received assistance from both his brother and the king of France in this undertaking, for Durazzo (the remnant of the kingdom) was in the hands of Charles Thopia. In 1372, he brought over the Navarrese Company of mercenaries, who had fought with him during the war in France, to assist him in taking Durazzo. Their ranks swelled considerably in 1375 with new recruits directly from Navarre. Many documents survive telling us of the complex nature of the military planning and engineering which was undertaken to ensure success. This they attained, taking the city in midsummer 1376. Louis died shortly after.

He had an illegitimate son, Carlos de Beaumont, who would be the founder of the House of Beaumont, which would have a main role in the Navarrese Civil War next century.

References

Sources
238

1341 births
1376 deaths
Albanian monarchs
Navarrese infantes
House of Évreux
Albanian nobility
Sons of kings